Landskrona Municipality (Landskrona kommun) is a municipality in Scania County in Sweden. Its seat is located in the city of Landskrona.

The island of Ven was added to the City of Landskrona in 1959. The amalgamations leading to the present municipality took place in 1967, 1969 and 1974. Since 1971 it is a municipality of unitary type, like all other municipalities of Sweden. The municipality, however, prefers to style itself Landskrona stad (City of Landskrona). This is purely nominal and has no effect on the status of the municipality.

Localities

There are 8 urban areas (Swedish: Tätort, or locality) in Landskrona Municipality. In the table they are listed according to the size of the population as of December 31, 2005. The municipal seat is in bold characters.

Elections
Below are the results since the 1973 municipal reform listed. Between 1988 and 1998 the Sweden Democrats' results were not published by the SCB due to the party's small size nationwide. "Turnout" denotes the percentage of the electorate casting a ballot, but "Votes" only applies to valid ballots cast.

Riksdag

Blocs

This lists the relative strength of the socialist and centre-right blocs since 1973, but parties not elected to the Riksdag are inserted as "other", including the Sweden Democrats results from 1988 to 2006, but also the Christian Democrats pre-1991 and the Greens in 1982, 1985 and 1991. The sources are identical to the table above. The coalition or government mandate marked in bold formed the government after the election. New Democracy got elected in 1991 but are still listed as "other" due to the short lifespan of the party. "Elected" is the total number of percentage points from the municipality that went to parties who were elected to the Riksdag.

International relations

Twin towns — Sister cities
The municipality is twinned with:
 Glostrup Municipality
 Plochingen
 Kotka
 Võru

See also
Municipalities of Sweden
SK7MQ

References
Statistics Sweden

External links

 Landskrona Municipality - Official site

 
 
Municipalities of Skåne County
Scania